Újszász is a town in Jász-Nagykun-Szolnok county, in the Northern Great Plain region of central Hungary.

Geography

Twin towns – sister cities
Újszász is twinned with:
 Auzeville-Tolosane, France (1997)
 Ciceu, Romania (2005)
 Gmina Dębica, Poland (2004)
 Palić (Subotica), Serbia (2013)

References

External links

  in Hungarian

Populated places in Jász-Nagykun-Szolnok County